Pool cleaner may refer to:

Automated pool cleaner
Swimming pool service technician, clean pools and service major pool equipment